Communauté d'agglomération Plaine Vallée is the communauté d'agglomération, an intercommunal structure, covering northwestern suburbs of Paris. It is located in the Val-d'Oise department, in the Île-de-France region, northern France. It was created in January 2016. Its seat is in Montmorency. Its area is 74.1 km2. Its population was 182,585 in 2018.

Composition
The communauté d'agglomération consists of the following 18 communes:

Andilly
Attainville
Bouffémont
Deuil-la-Barre
Domont
Enghien-les-Bains
Ézanville
Groslay
Margency
Moisselles
Montlignon
Montmagny
Montmorency
Piscop
Saint-Brice-sous-Forêt
Saint-Gratien
Saint-Prix
Soisy-sous-Montmorency

References

Plaine Vallee
Plaine Vallee